Nicolás Massú was the defending champion but lost in the first round to Agustín Calleri.

Carlos Moyà won in the final 6–3, 4–6, 6–4 against Guillermo Coria.

Seeds

  Carlos Moyá (champion)
  David Nalbandian (quarterfinals)
  Fernando González (second round)
  Gastón Gaudio (semifinals)
  Juan Ignacio Chela (quarterfinals)
  Gustavo Kuerten (semifinals)
  Nicolás Lapentti (second round)
  Guillermo Coria (final)

Draw

Finals

Top half

Bottom half

External links
 2003 Copa AT&T Main Draw

ATP Buenos Aires
2003 ATP Tour
ATP